Restless is the third studio album by rapper Xzibit. It was released December 12, 2000. It debuted at #14 on the Billboard 200 with approximately 205,000 copies sold in its 1st week released. The album then fell 17 spots to #31 in the 2nd week, but then rose back up 19 spots to peak at #12 the following week. Also since being released the album was certified Platinum by the RIAA with an excess of a million copies sold in America making it Xzibit's most successful album of his career.

Background 
In an interview with N.O.R.E. on his podcast, Drink Champs, Xzibit told a story of how Dr. Dre became involved with the project as an executive producer and Loud exec Steve Rifkind's lack of involvement. He discussed the conversation between Dre and Rifkind: "So I was at odds with the label...and so then when we finished the tour, he was like 'Let's go do a record.' I was like, 'I'm only gonna do it if you take care of Dr. Dre.' And Dr. Dre was like, 'You gonna pay me this, and we're gonna fuckin' do this. And then we gon' get it done. But I don't want this money to come from Xzibit, I want it to come from you. And that's why the record is out.'" Xzibit credits this conversation as one that gave his project the green light.

Reception 

Restless received generally positive reviews from music critics. AllMusic, Rolling Stone and Vibe all gave the album 4 out of 5 stars. At Metacritic, which assigns a normalized rating out of 100 to reviews from mainstream critics, the album received an average score of 75, based on 11 reviews.

Track listing

Charts

Weekly charts

Year-end charts

Certifications

References

2000 albums
Xzibit albums
Albums produced by Battlecat (producer)
Albums produced by Dr. Dre
Albums produced by DJ Quik
Albums produced by Eminem
Albums produced by Erick Sermon
Albums produced by Rick Rock
Albums produced by Rockwilder
Albums produced by Scott Storch
Albums produced by Soopafly
Albums produced by Nottz
Loud Records albums